Ahmad Fathi Sorour (born 9 July 1932) is an Egyptian politician who was the Speaker of the People's Assembly of Egypt from 1990 until the Egyptian Revolution of 2011. Previously he served in the government as Minister of Education from 1986 to 1990.

Sorour was first elected to the People's Assembly in April 1989, and he was elected as Speaker in November 1990. He was President of the Council of the Inter-Parliamentary Union in 1994–1997 and also served as President of the Union of African Parliaments in 1990–1991. According to Article 84 of the Egyptian Constitution, Sorour, as Speaker of the People's Assembly, was first in the order of succession to become President of Egypt if the President died, became incapacitated, or resigned. Upon the resignation of Hosni Mubarak in 2011, however, the military, headed by Mohamed Hussein Tantawi, assumed control of the state.

Allegations and controversies

Allegations of non-compliance with the judiciary
Sorour was widely criticized for article 93 of the Egyptian Constitution: "The parliament is the master of its decisions", meaning that the parliament could make a decision about its membership regardless of any judicial decisions. This article caused significant concerns amidst allegations that parliamentary elections were repeatedly and systematically rigged.  Sorour continued to assert that the parliament was the competent authority to decide the validity of its memberships despite the widely acknowledged allegations of rigging. Following the Egyptian revolution of 2011 Sorour's parliament was dissolved and article 93 was referred for revision.

2011 revolution
In the aftermath of the revolution in Egypt (January 25, 2011- February 11, 2011) the  Supreme Military Council, led by Field Marshal Mohamed Hussein Tantawi, was appointed to the position of Acting President. The Supreme Military Council dissolved the Egyptian Parliament which was headed by Sorour. This came following widespread allegations that the elections leading to this parliament, headed by Sorour, were rigged. On February 14, 2011 the Egyptian daily news Alwafd reported that the ruling military authorities opted to prosecute a senior member of Sorour's team for allegedly burning confidential documents in Sorour's office. The same newspaper reported that a restraining order was issued preventing Sorour from entering the parliament building  following allegations of smuggling undisclosed documents from the building. Sorour was seen as one of the figures that caused the fall of Mubarak's rule. Some believed that Mubarak's mistake was that he increasingly gave too much latitude to his son's cabal, including Ahmad Fathi Sorour, among others.

Fathi Sorour openly supported measures taken to crack down on the pro-democracy demonstrations in Egypt. In a televised interview with Elmehwar TV in January 2011, Sorour was asked for an opinion on the US disapproval of the Egyptian authorities' action: disconnecting internet services in an attempt to halt the demonstrations. Sorour replied that the US "did more than that when it was subjected to terrorism", portraying some similarity between pro-democracy demonstrators in Egypt and the terrorists who attacked the United States. Sorour subsequently stated that he didn't view the pro-democracy demonstrators as terrorists.

References

External links
Profile at the Egyptian People's Assembly
Profile at the Egypt State Information Service
Profile at the Interparliamentary Union

Ahmed Fathi Sorour collected news and commentary at Ikhwanweb

Speakers of the Parliament of Egypt
1932 births
Living people
National Democratic Party (Egypt) politicians
Permanent Delegates of Egypt to UNESCO
Higher education ministers of Egypt
Education Ministers of Egypt